Bobby Kimmel (born September 1, 1940) is an American musician and songwriter who currently performs with the acoustic folk group I Hear Voices. He has been recording and performing in concert for over 50 years and was a founding member of the Stone Poneys, along with Linda Ronstadt and the late Kenny Edwards.

Bobby Kimmel moved to Tucson as a child for his asthmatic condition. His father was a studio musician in New York City, and become the principal double bass player in the Tucson Symphony Orchestra. He also owned and operated a retail music shop near the university.

Kimmel's early musical influence was jazz, especially "West Coast" jazz. He also listened to the "harder" East Coast jazz. His passion for jazz continued all throughout his high school years, and it was not until he discovered the guitar (at age 17) that his musical direction changed.

He became aware of the folk and blues musicians such as Doc Watson, Lightnin Hopkins, Merle Travis, and Mississippi John Hurt, as well as contemporaries like Dick Rosmini, Steve Mann and Ry Cooder. Phonorecords from his father's music store at this time contributed invaluably to his musical education.

At that point, Kimmel fully turned his attention toward folk music. He began playing both bass and guitar in the folk music clubs around Tucson in the early 1960s. He started performing with his friend Linda Ronstadt. During that period he played bass in a folk group with Linda and her older brother and sister Peter and Suzie.

The LA Years
In 1963, Bobby left Tucson for Los Angeles to further his music career. Quickly he called Linda to join him in LA.

Linda agreed, together they formed The Stone Poneys with LA guitarist Kenny Edwards. After a few months of rehearsal (including in the local laundromat which had great acoustics), the trio played an open mike gig at The Troubador in West Los Angeles. That one performance resulted in a multi—album contract with Capitol Records.

The Stone Poneys
The Stone Poneys recorded three albums for Capitol in the mid-60s and had a major hit in 1967 with "Different Drum", written by soon-to-be Monkees member Michael Nesmith. Different Drum peaked at #12 on the Cashbox Top 100 chart on February 12, 1968. The first two Stone Poney albums mostly featured Bobby's original songs.

The band toured nationally and played the popular music TV shows of the day. They appeared on The Tonight Show Starring Johnny Carson in New York. They even toured briefly as the opening act for The Doors when "Light My Fire" was a huge hit and Jim Morrison was quickly becoming a pop music phenom.

Just about the time "Different Drum" became a nationwide hit, Kenny Edwards quit The Stone Poneys. That was the beginning of the end. Linda and Bobby played one more tour under The Stone Poneys name with pick-up musicians, and the group disbanded at the end of the tour.

McCabe's Guitar Shop
After the Stone Poneys broke up, Bobby created and developed the concert series at McCabe's Guitar Shop in Santa Monica, California. It became one of the premier acoustic music venues in the country. By the time he left 7 years later, McCabe's was a notable concert venue attracting artists such as Jackson Browne, Odetta, Emmylou Harris, Bill Monroe, Jennifer Warnes, Doc & Merle Watson, The New Grass Revival, David Grisman, Tom Waits, Chet Atkins and Shep Cooke had all headlined there - and many others.

In the mid-1970s, Bobby also teamed up with Shep Cooke (also from Tucson and who was on the final Stone Poneys tour) Andrew Gold, and LA musician Kit Alderson. They formed The Floating House Band, an acoustic singing trio. They recorded an album for Takoma Records, which was owned by folk guitarist John Fahey.

With Doc & Merle Watson
In the late 70s, Bobby went out on the road playing upright bass with Doc & Merle Watson. They played the New Orleans Jazz & Heritage Festival.

Japan
Bobby's last music business endeavor in Los Angeles was arranging tours in Japan by American folk artists. Working in tandem with his Japanese partner Hiroshi Asada, they booked tours for three years, including tours by Jesse Colin Young, LA session guitarist Larry Carlton, The New Grass Revival and a bluegrass all-star band featuring David Grisman, Tony Rice, Richard Greene, Bill Keith, Peter Rowan and Todd Phillips. Kimmel went on several of these tours as road manager.

Back In Tucson - 4 Corners
Bobby moved back to Tucson in 2001 and connected with his friend Jo Wilkinson, a powerful lead singer and songwriter from LA who also moved there. Since Jo and Bobby had played together at parties in LA,  they got the idea of forming an acoustic singing band here. They went to the 2002 Tucson Folk Festival together, and on the second day they heard Stefan George and Lavinia White. Bobby immediately approached Stefan and Lavinia and proposed that the four of them get together to play music. Stefan and Lavinia were cautious at first, but after a while and a number of casual living room sessions at Bobby's house, they warmed to the idea and finally 4 Corners was formed. At the beginning of 2003, the quartet began rehearsing seriously.

4 Corners sang together for 3 1/2 years and released two CDs before Jo left the group in the summer of 2006.

BK Special
After Jo left 4 Corners, Bobby, Stefan and Lavinia decided to try to go on as a trio.

Bobby had written a group of new songs full of possibilities for rich harmonies, and much room for Stefan to play. (Bobby and Stefan had figured out how two finger-style guitarists could play together). So along with a crop of Stefan's latest songs to work with, the band quickly developed a new repertoire and a new harmony sound. The acoustic music community in Tucson was quick to embrace them.

The BK Special CD - with Linda Ronstadt
Although BK Special only formed in the summer of 2006, by the end of that year, they were already talking about recording their first CD. They followed through, and in March 2007 the trio went into Duncan Stitt's A Writer's Room studio to begin recording. They recorded 12 songs live in the studio over the next couple of weeks.

Somewhere toward the end of the mixing process, and before Stefan's return, Bobby got a call from Linda Ronstadt who was in Tucson and wanted to visit. They went out to dinner, and during the evening Bobby was raving about how excited he was with the way the CD was turning out. Linda said, "I'd love to hear some of it." Since they were near Bobby's house, Linda stopped by and Bobby played her a few of the rough mixes.

Linda was immediately impressed with the sound Duncan had achieved on the all-acoustic CD, and really liked the trio's three-part vocals. One of the songs Bobby played was his own Into The Arms Of Love, and Linda started singing a pretty harmony part under her breath. Bobby asked if she would sing that part on the CD and Linda said, "Sure." That was it.

By the time Stefan came back from Germany, the CD was nearly mixed - and Linda had agreed to sing on it. The band quickly cleaned up whatever remained to be done, Linda came into Duncan's studio and added her vocal part, Stefan mastered it with Craig Schumacher at Wave Lab, and off it went to be manufactured.

The Second BK Special CD
In 2010, BK Special released their second CD Hope Spring, containing eight original songs by Bobby Kimmel. Both BK Special CDs remain in print and available.

I Hear Voices!
At the beginning of 2012, Bobby retired BK Special after almost ten years together to focus on a lifelong dream of forming a quartet with a purely vocal concept and almost no instrumental presence. Bobby joined with Tucson musicians Kathy Harris, Bobby Ronstadt and Suzy Ronstadt to form I Hear Voices! and realize that dream.

I Hear Voices! released their self-titled CD in the summer of 2013 during their appearance at the Tucson Folk Festival where they had a featured spot. In July 2013 the group traveled to Santa Monica, CA to play McCabe's Guitar Shop, the club Bobby opened in 1969, and had become one of the premier acoustic venues in the country.

Discography
Numbers in parentheses indicate the date of release, and also the highest position on Billboard charts

Singles
 The Stone Poneys - "Sweet Summer Blue and Gold" b/w "All the Beautiful Things" (rel. 1/67) – #45-1024 Capitol Records
 The Stone Poneys - "One for One" b/w "Evergreen" (rel. 6/67) – #5910; Capitol Records
 The Stone Poneys - "Different Drum" b/w "I've Got to Know" (rel. 9/67) – #2004; (#13) Capitol Records
 The Stone Poneys - "Up to My Neck in High Muddy Water" b/w "Carnival Bear" (rel. 3/68) – #2110; (#93) Capitol Records
 The Stone Poneys - "Some of Shelly's Blues" b/w "Hobo" (rel. 5/68) – #2195; Capitol Records

Albums
 The Stone Poneys - The Stone Poneys (album) – (rel. 1/67) Capitol Records
 The Stone Poneys - Evergreen, Volume 2 – (rel. 6/67) (#100) Capitol Records
 The Stone Poneys - Linda Ronstadt, Stone Poneys and Friends, Vol. III – (rel. 4/68) Capitol Records
 The Stone Poneys - The Stone Poneys Featuring Linda Ronstadt – (rel. 3/75, reissue of first album)  (#172) Capitol Records
 The Floating House Band - The Floating House Band - (rel. 1972) Takoma Records
 4 Corners - 4 Corners
 4 Corners - 4 Corners Live at McCabes
 BK Special - BK Special (rel. 2007)
 BK Special - Hope Springs (rel. 2010)
 I Hear Voices! - I Hear Voices! (rel. 2013)
 I Hear Voices! - I Hear Voices with Strings (rel. 2015)

Compilation albums
 The Stone Poneys - Stoney End (Linda Ronstadt album) – (rel. 1970) Capitol Records
 The Stone Poneys - The Stone Poneys (two-fer CD) – (rel. 2008) Capitol Records

References

External links
Biography on BK Special Website
History of Stone Poneys
I Hear Voices! Website
Andrew Gold (Former Bandmate with Bobby Kimmel in The Floating House Band)
Shep Cooke (Former Bobby Kimmel Bandmate in both Stone Poneys and The Floating House Band)

Living people
Musicians from Tucson, Arizona
American folk rock musicians
Songwriters from Arizona
1940 births